Hunyadi László (László Hunyadi)  is an opera in three acts by the Hungarian composer Ferenc Erkel. The libretto, by Béni Egressy, is based on a play by Lőrinc Tóth. The opera was first performed at the Pesti Nemzeti Magyar Szinház, Budapest on 27 January 1844. Hunyadi László is considered to be the first important Hungarian opera and Erkel's musical style draws on folk influences, particularly the dance known as the verbunkos.

Roles

Synopsis
The opera is based on events which took place in Hungary in 1456-7. The great military leader, János Hunyadi, who defended Hungary against the attacks of the Ottoman Turks is dead and power has passed to his enemies. The new king, László V, is weak and surrounded by evil advisers, who counsel him to kill Hunyadi's son, László, a leading figure in the Hungarian army. László is warned of the plot and survives. The king pretends friendship with the young man but his mother, Erzsébet, fears for the lives of her sons. The king falls in love with László's fiancée, Mária, and persuades her father to force her to marry him instead. He has László arrested, accusing him of being in a conspiracy. Mária fails in her bid to free László from prison and he is condemned to death, the executioner only succeeding in cutting off his head at the fourth attempt.

Recordings
 There exists a famous recording of the aria "Nagy ég ..." (known as the La Grange aria, because it was written in honor of the soprano Anna de La Grange) made by the great American dramatic soprano Lillian Nordica in 1907, for Columbia Records. This particularly brilliant example of Nordica's singing has been reissued on CD by Marston Records (number 52027-2) and other labels.
 Simándy József (Hunyadi László), Szabó Miklós, Faragó András, Szönyi Olga, Jámbor LásLó, Orosz Júlia, Déry Gabriella, Bódy József, Pálffy Endre, Petri Miklós, The Choir of the Hungarian Radio, The Choir of the Hungarian Army Central Ensemble, The Orchestra of the Budapest Philharmonic Society (recorded date: June 29-July 9, 1960, by Qualiton). 
 Hunyadi László András Molnár, Istvan Gáti, Sylvia Sass, Dénes Gulyás, Hungarian State Opera and Chorus, conducted by J. Kovács (Hungaroton, 1985).

Sources
 The Viking Opera Guide ed. Holden (Viking, 1993)
 Del Teatro (in Italian)
 
 The Oxford Illustrated History of Opera ed. Parker (OUP, 1994)

Hungarian-language operas
Operas by Ferenc Erkel
1844 operas
Operas
Operas based on plays
Operas set in Hungary